The Australian Music Examinations Board (AMEB) is a federated, privately funded corporation which provides a program of examinations for music, speech and drama in Australia.

The organisation had its beginnings at the Universities of Melbourne and Adelaide in 1887 and later became a national body in 1918. It now has six state offices as well as a Federal Office in Melbourne. The Federal Board consists of representatives of educational institutions that are signatories to the AMEB constitution. These are the Universities of Melbourne, Adelaide and Western Australia, the Minister for Education and Training, New South Wales, the Minister for Education, Training and Employment, Queensland and the Minister for Education and Skills, Tasmania through the University of Tasmania. The AMEB is used to determine admission into the Defence Force School of Music in Victoria.

AMEB examinations are based on syllabuses set by the Federal Board in conjunction with the music and speech and drama community. AMEB produces a range of publications which support students and teachers preparing for exams.

AMEB offers syllabuses and examinations in a broad range of subjects including:

 Music Teaching
 Music Theory (Theory of Music, Musicianship, Music Craft)
 Keyboard (Piano, Piano for Leisure, P Plate Piano, Organ, Electronic Organ)
 Strings (Violin, Viola, Cello, Double Bass, Classical Guitar, Harp)
 Woodwind (Recorder, Flute, Oboe, Clarinet, Bassoon, Saxophone, Saxophone for Leisure)
 Brass (Horn, Trumpet, Trombone, Bass Trombone, Tuba, Euphonium)
 Brass Band Instruments (Instruments in B flat, E flat and C)
 Percussion
 Voice (Singing, Singing for Leisure)
 Contemporary Popular Music (Keyboard, Vocal, Drum Kit, Guitar, Bass)
 Musical Ensembles (Brass, Mixed, Percussion, Strings, Woodwind)
 Speech and Drama

AMEB examinations cover a large range of skill levels; from a "Preliminary" grade suitable for very young children through to academic degree-level diplomas, including the Associate in Music (AMusA), the Licentiate in Music (LMusA), and ultimately the Fellowship in Music (FMusA), a diploma that is often conferred on an honorary basis to musical luminaries.

AMEB has recently introduced online examinations for music theory and online courses for Theory of Music.

In addition to the standard syllabuses, AMEB has a series of "for leisure" syllabuses for the piano, saxophone and voice which contain a repertoire of modern music. AMEB also has a Contemporary Popular Music (CPM) offering for Keyboard, Drum Kit, Guitar, Bass and Voice.

References

External links
Official website

Performing arts education in Australia
Music education organizations
Organizations established in 1887
Music organisations based in Australia